Nannamoria gotoi is a species of sea snail, a marine gastropod mollusk in the family Volutidae, the volutes.

References

  Poppe, G., 1992. New species and a new subspecies in Volutidae (Mollusca:Gastropoda). Malacologia Mostra Mondiale 11: 3-21

Volutidae
Gastropods described in 1992